Eric Arenas Centeno (born 3 June 1971) is a Peruvian slalom canoer who competed in the early 1990s. He finished 42nd in the K-1 event at the 1992 Summer Olympics in Barcelona.

Centeno was born in Cusco.

References
Sports-Reference.com profile

External links

1971 births
Canoeists at the 1992 Summer Olympics
Living people
Olympic canoeists of Peru
Peruvian male canoeists
20th-century Peruvian people